Maloy can refer to:

 Thomas Joel Maloy, American naval officer, posthumous recipient of the Navy Cross
 Mike Maloy, American professional basketball player
 Maloy Lozanes, Philippine-born recording artist in Germany known as MaLoY
 USS Maloy (DE-791), an American destroyer

Geography 
 Maloy, Iowa, a town in the United States
 Måløy, a town in Norway